Pratola Peligna Superiore is a railway station near Pratola Peligna, Italy. The station is located on the Terni–Sulmona railway. The train services are operated by Trenitalia.

Train services
The station is served by the following service(s):

Regional services (Treno regionale) L'Aquila - Sulmona

References

This article is based upon a translation of the Italian language version as at October 2014.

Railway stations in Abruzzo
Buildings and structures in the Province of L'Aquila